Tom Green County is a county located on the Edwards Plateau in the U.S. state of Texas. As of the 2020 census, its population was 120,003. Its county seat is San Angelo. The county was created in 1874 and organized the following year. It is named for Thomas Green, who was a Confederate soldier and lawyer. Tom Green County is included in the San Angelo metropolitan statistical area; the county is home to Goodfellow Air Force Base, as well as Angelo State University, part of the Texas Tech University System.

History
The county was established by the state legislature on March 13, 1874, and named after Thomas Green, a Confederate brigadier general.

The original county seat was the town of Ben Ficklin. In 1882, flood waters of the Concho River destroyed the town and drowned 65 people. The county seat was moved to Santa Angela. In 1883, the town's name was officially changed to San Angelo by the United States Post Office. Following completion of the Santa Fe Railway in September 1888, the county has increase its cattle production to an estimated export of 3,500 to 5,000 railroad cars. In 1889, San Angelo became incorporated to a city, and the Fort Concho shut down after 22 years of operation.

Tom Green County has a long, narrow strip of land extending to the west. This unusual feature is because Reagan County to the west used to be part of Tom Green County, and the state of Texas required that all counties have a contiguous land route to their county seat. Therefore, the small strip of land served to connect the two main regions. In 1903, the residents of the western section voted to form the Reagan County, while in the same vote the connecting strip was decided to remain as part of Tom Green County.

During the Winter Storm Uri, San Angelo City endured 152 hours at or below freezing temperatures. Some of the hurricanes and tropical storms that have hit Tom Green includes:

 
 Hurricane Matagorda (1942)
Tropical Storm Delia (1973)
Hurricane Gilbert (1988)
 Tropical Storm Erin (2007)
 Tropical Storm Hermine (2010)

Geography
The county's protect areas are Lake Nasworthy, O.C. Fisher Reservoir, Twin Buttes Reservoir, San Angelo State Park and Heart of Texas Wildlife Trail. Tom Green County also have the Concho Rivers, North Concho River, South Concho River; and a small creek named Kickapoo Creek as well.

Adjacent counties
 Coke County (north)
 Runnels County (northeast)
 Concho County (east)
 Menard County (southeast)
 Schleicher County (south)
 Irion County (west)
 Reagan County (west)
 Sterling County (northwest)

Demographics

Note: the US Census treats Hispanic/Latino as an ethnic category. This table excludes Latinos from the racial categories and assigns them to a separate category. Hispanics/Latinos can be of any race.

As of the census of 2000, 104,010 people, 39,503 households, and 26,783 families resided in the county. The population density was 68 people/sq mi (26/km2). The 43,916 housing units averaged 29/ sq mi (11/km2). The racial makeup of the county was 50.76% White, 5.13% African American, 0.65% Native American, 0.86% Asian, 0.07% Pacific Islander, 12.82% from other races, and 2.39% from two or more races. About 30.71% of the population were Hispanic or Latino of any race, 13.2% were of German, 10.7% American, 8.2% English, and 7.2% Irish ancestry according to Census 2000.

Of the 39,503 households, 33.00% had children under the age of 18 living with them, 52.10% were married couples living together, 11.90% had a female householder with no husband present, and 32.20% were not families. About 27.2% of all households were made up of individuals, and 10.80% had someone living alone who was 65 or older. The average household size was 2.52, and the average family size was 3.09.

In the county, the age distribution was 26.10% under 18, 12.80% from 18 to 24, 27.10% from 25 to 44, 20.60% from 45 to 64, and 13.40% who were 65 or older. The median age was 34 years. For every 100 females, there were 93.70 males. For every 100 females age 18 and over, there were 89.90 males.

The median income for a household in the county was $33,148, and for a family was $39,482. Males had a median income of $27,949 versus $20,683 for females. The per capita income for the county was $17,325. About 11.20% of families and 15.20% of the population were below the poverty line, including 20.20% of those under age 18 and 11.80% of those age 65 or over.

Education

Colleges
 Angelo State University
 Howard College

Public school districts 
 Christoval Independent School District
 Grape Creek Independent School District
 Miles Independent School District
 San Angelo Independent School District
 Veribest Independent School District
 Wall Independent School District
 Water Valley Independent School District

Transportation

Major highways 
  U.S. Highway 67
  U.S. Highway 87
  U.S. Highway 277
 
   SH Loop 306

Communities

City
 San Angelo (county seat)

Census-designated places
 Carlsbad
 Christoval
 Grape Creek

Unincorporated communities

 Harriett
 Knickerbocker
 Mereta
 Tankersley
 Vancourt
 Veribest
 Wall
 Water Valley

Ghost town
 Ben Ficklin

Military base
 Goodfellow Air Force Base

Politics

Notable resident 

 August Pfluger is an American politician and retired military officer, and he is the U.S. representative for Texas's 11th congressional district.

See also

 List of museums in West Texas
 National Register of Historic Places listings in Tom Green County, Texas
 USS Tom Green County (LST-1159)
 Recorded Texas Historic Landmarks in Tom Green County

References

External links

 Tom Green County government's website
 Tom Green County in Handbook of Texas Online at the University of Texas
 County genealogy links at Rootsweb
 Entry for Tom Green from the Biographical Encyclopedia of Texas published 1880, hosted by the Portal to Texas History.
 San Angelo LIVE! News, live events and music in San Angelo, the county seat of Tom Green County

 
1875 establishments in Texas
Populated places established in 1875